Timothy O'Neal, a Republican, represents the 48th district in the Pennsylvania House of Representatives. He was first elected following a special election in May 2018. He was sworn in on June 5, 2018.

Committee assignments 

 Appropriations
 Environmental Resources & Energy
 Insurance
 Veterans Affairs & Emergency Preparedness

References 

Republican Party members of the Pennsylvania House of Representatives
Living people
21st-century American politicians
1980 births